The Workers' Youth League may refer to:

Workers' Youth League (Norway) (Arbeidernes Ungdomsfylking, 1927–present)
Workers' Youth League (Sweden) (Arbetarnas Ungdomsförbund, 1924–1926)